Eduard Blănuță (born 30 March 1971) is a Moldovan professional football manager and former player who is currently the head coach of the Moldova women's national team.

Playing career
Blănuță spent his playing career in Moldova and the Czech Republic.

Managerial career
He was the head coach of Petrocub Hîncești between July 2012 and June 2017. In December 2019, he was appointed head coach of the Moldova women's national team.

Personal life
He is the father of Vladislav Blănuță.

References

External links
 
 

1971 births
Living people
Footballers from Chișinău
Moldovan footballers
Association football forwards
Moldovan football managers
Moldovan Super Liga managers
CS Petrocub Hîncești managers